Cara Black and Elena Likhovtseva were the defending champions, but lost in semifinals to Conchita Martínez and Patricia Tarabini.

Virginia Ruano Pascual and Paola Suárez won the title by defeating Conchita Martínez and Patricia Tarabini 6–3, 6–4 in the final. It was the 13th title for Ruano Pascual and the 21st title for Suárez in their respective doubles careers. It was also the 3rd title for the pair during the season, after their wins in Bogotá and Acapulco.

Seeds
The first four seeds received a bye into the second round.

Draw

Finals

Top half

Bottom half

Qualifying

Seeds

Qualifiers
  Rossana de los Ríos /  Lilia Osterloh

Lucky losers
  Tatiana Panova /  Tatiana Poutchek

Qualifying draw

References
 Official results archive (ITF)
 Official results archive (WTA)

Women's Doubles
Italian Open - Doubles